The 2020–21 DePaul Blue Demons women's basketball team represented DePaul University during the 2020–21 NCAA Division I women's basketball season. The Blue Demons were led by thirty-fifth year head coach Doug Bruno and played their home games at the Wintrust Arena as members of the Big East Conference.

They finished the season 14–10, 11–5 in Big East play to finish in fourth place. As the fourth seed in the Big East tournament they lost in the Quarterfinals to Villanova. The received an at-large invitation to the WNIT, where they played in the Rockford Regional.  They lost in the First Round to Saint Louis and lost their consolation game to Drake.

Previous season
They finished the season 28–5, 15–3 in Big East play to finish in first place.  DePaul won the Big East Conference tournament championship game over Marquette, 88–74.
The NCAA tournament was cancelled due to the COVID-19 outbreak.

Roster

Schedule

Source:

|-
!colspan=6 style=| Non-conference regular season

|-
!colspan=6 style=| Big East regular season

|-
!colspan=6 style=| Big East Women's Tournament

|-
!colspan=6 style=| WNIT

Rankings

The Coaches Poll did not release a Week 2 poll and the AP Poll did not release a poll after the NCAA Tournament.

See also
2020–21 DePaul Blue Demons men's basketball team

References

DePaul
DePaul Blue Demons women's basketball seasons
Depaul
Depaul
Clemson